William Moorcroft may refer to:

 William Moorcroft (cricketer), English cricketer
 William Moorcroft (explorer) (1770–1825), English explorer and veterinarian
 William Moorcroft (potter) (1872–1945)